'Atco Dragway' is a 1/4 mile dragstrip located in the Atco section of Waterford Township, New Jersey.

History
Built in 1959, The first racers (Motor Masters hot rod club ) started at the top end racing towards the starting line. 
They then helped open the track on Mermorial day weekend 1960 as the official opening date. 

Officially Opened Memorial Day weekend 1960, it is the oldest drag strip in New Jersey.  The track is also sanctioned by the NHRA, the largest sanctioning body in drag racing.  Atco Dragway held over 265 events last year, making it one of the busiest tracks in the country.

See also
Atco, New Jersey 
Old Bridge Township Raceway Park
Drag racing
Dragster
  
Notes
Alan E. Brown. The History of America's Speedways: Past & Present'', Comstock Park, Michigan: Brown, 2003, pp. 458

References

External links

Buildings and structures in Camden County, New Jersey
NHRA Division 1 drag racing venues
Sports venues in New Jersey
Tourist attractions in Camden County, New Jersey
Waterford Township, New Jersey
1960 establishments in New Jersey
Sports venues completed in 1960